Eedes is a surname. Notable people with the surname include:

John Eedes (1609?-1667?), English divine
Richard Eedes (disambiguation)

See also
Edes (disambiguation)